Falsamblesthis seriepilosa is a species of beetle in the family Cerambycidae. It was described by Theodor Franz Wilhelm Kirsch in 1889. It is known from Ecuador.

References

Forsteriini
Beetles described in 1889